Parornix mixta is a moth of the family Gracillariidae. It is known from Italy, Romania, Slovakia, former Yugoslavia and Transbaikalia in Russia.

The larvae feed on Spiraea media and Spiraea x vanhouttei. They probably mine the leaves of their host plant.

References

Parornix
Moths of Europe
Moths of Asia
Moths described in 1980